was a Japanese writer and poet. He was best known for his memoirs Coffinman: The Journal of a Buddhist Mortician, published in 1993.  The book was based on his diaries during a period in which he worked as a mortician in the 1970s, a profession which is traditionally regarded as a taboo in Japan due to their perception of death. In 2008 his memoirs were adapted into a successful Academy Award-winning feature film, Departures, by filmmaker Yōjirō Takita.

Aoki died on 6 August 2022, at the age of 85.

References

1937 births
2022 deaths
Japanese Buddhists
20th-century Japanese poets
21st-century Japanese poets
20th-century Japanese novelists
21st-century Japanese novelists
People related to Jōdo Shinshū
People from Toyama Prefecture